Vexillum (Costellaria) michaui is a species of small sea snail, marine gastropod mollusk in the family Costellariidae, the ribbed miters.

There are two subspecies:
 Vexillum (Costellaria) michaui michaui (Crosse & P. Fischer, 1864)
 Vexillum (Costellaria) michaui wilsi Buijse & Dekker, 1990

Description

Distribution
This species occurs in the Indian Ocean in the Mascarene Basin.

References

 Turner H. 2001. Katalog der Familie Costellariidae Macdonald, 1860. Conchbooks. 1-100 page(s): 44 
 Buijse J.A., Dekker H. & Verbinnen G. (2009) The identities of Mitra fidicula Gould, 1850, Mitra michaui Crosse & Fischer, 1864 and Mitra intertaeniata G.B. Sowerby II, 1874, with the description of a new Vexillum species (Gastropoda: Costellariidae). Visaya 2(4): 16–51. [Published June 2009] page(s): 18

External links
  Liénard, Élizé. Catalogue de la faune malacologique de l'île Maurice et de ses dépendances comprenant les îles Seychelles, le groupe de Chagos composé de Diego-Garcia, Six-îles, Pèros-Banhos, Salomon, etc., l'île Rodrigues, l'île de Cargados ou Saint-Brandon. J. Tremblay, 1877.
  Cernohorsky, Walter Oliver. The Mitridae of Fiji; The veliger vol. 8 (1965)

michaui
Gastropods described in 1864